A certificate of incorporation is a legal document/license relating to the formation of a company or corporation. It is a license to form a corporation issued by state government or, in some jurisdictions, by non-governmental entity/corporation. Its precise meaning depends upon the legal system in which it is used.

Commonwealth systems
In the U.S. a certificate of incorporation is usually used as an alternative description of a corporation's articles of incorporation. The certificate of incorporation, or articles of incorporation, form a major constituent part of the constitutional documents of the corporation. In English and Commonwealth legal systems, a certificate of incorporation is usually a simple certificate issued by the relevant government registry as confirmation of the due incorporation and valid existence of the company.

In other common law legal systems, the certificate of incorporation has less legal significance. However, it has been held by the House of Lords in Cotman v Brougham (1918), AC 514, that because the issue of the certificate of incorporation is conclusive evidence of the formation of a company, the issuance of the certificate overrides any irregularities which may have occurred during the formation of the company.

References

Business law
Corporate law
Organizational documents